Curva Municipality is the second municipal section of the Bautista Saavedra Province in the  La Paz Department, Bolivia. Its seat is Curva.

See also 
 Ch'uxña Quta
 Kunturini
 K'usilluni
 Qillwa Quta
 Qutañani
 Supay Punku
 Ulla Qhaya
 Wila Kunka

References 

 Instituto Nacional de Estadística de Bolivia

Municipalities of La Paz Department (Bolivia)